Xilinhot Airport  is an airport serving the city of Xilinhot in Inner Mongolia, China.

Airlines and destinations

See also
List of airports in China

References

Airports in Inner Mongolia
Airports established in 1992